KKCL-FM (98.1 MHz, "Awesome 98!") is a radio station broadcasting a classic hits format. Licensed to Lorenzo, Texas and serving Lubbock, Texas, United States, the station is currently under ownership of Townsquare Media.  Its studios and transmitter are located in south Lubbock.

Two applications were filed for the channel that is now used by KKCL. A class A on 98.3 was allocated to Ralls, Texas. One filed for a class A in Ralls and the winner "KB Radio" (partnership of Bryan King and Steve Bumpous) filed for a new station in Lorenzo, Texas, which went on as KVOQ in 1984. The station ran round the clock from a studio and tower near the Lubbock (Idalou) Speedway racetrack. Then-regulations allowed a channel in the FCC table of allotments to be used in the listed city or in an unlisted city within a range of 10–15 miles depending on class of station.

BK arranged to move the station to a new site and adjacent channel for an upgraded signal on 98.1. This new construction permit was sold to Anthony Brandon in 1986, and studios moved to Park Tower at 28th and Avenue Q in Lubbock. The station was variously adult contemporary, easy listening, and finally oldies (with Rush Limbaugh) which finally put it on the map.

Lew Dee and Diana served as morning show hosts in the 1990s through February 2002. At that point, Lew Dew & Diana and Johnny May left Clear Channel Lubbock for RAMAR Communications. In the Spring of 2002 they started AC station 104.3 Stars FM. The format for the next nine years ended up bouncing around back and forth between 104.3 and 97.3 before being jettisoned for the 97.3 YES FM branding in September 2011.

Rush Limbaugh was moved off of KKCL to sister-station KFYO in 1999. From 1999 through the end of 2000, KFYO tape-delayed Rush Limbaugh from 1p-4p to air a Noon Ag Hour with Jim Stewart. Rush Limbaugh was moved to a live clearance (11a-2p) on KFYO in January 2001. Other West Texas talk stations, 710 KGNC and 1090 KKYN (now KVOP in Plainview) soon followed suit within a few years.

KKCL was sold to the Hicks family interests in the Fall of 1996 that eventually rolled up into Clear Channel Communications.  Clear Channel sold the station to Gap Broadcasting in 2007; what eventually became Gap Central Broadcasting (following the formation of GapWest Broadcasting) was folded into Townsquare Media on August 13, 2010.

On December 29, 2015, KKCL rebranded as "Awesome 98!", with a slight shift to 1970s/1980s music, along with some 1990s and 2000s music. Weekends feature All-80's music (Awesome 80's Weekends).

As of the Fall 2022 Nielsen Ratings, KKCL was the most-listened to radio station among Adults 25-54 in the Lubbock market during the workday.

Current line up:

Weekdays: Lance Ballance (6am-10am, also Director of Content), Sarah Sullivan (10am-2pm), Renee' Raven (2pm-7pm) & "The Night Shift" (7pm-12am)

Sundays: "America's Greatest Hits" with Scott Shannon (6pm-10pm)

References

External links
KKCL-FM official website

KCL
Radio stations established in 1984
Townsquare Media radio stations
Classic rock radio stations in the United States